Choanograptis is a genus of moths belonging to the subfamily Tortricinae of the family Tortricidae.

Species

Choanograptis ambigua Diakonoff, 1952
Choanograptis ammina (Diakonoff, 1983)
Choanograptis argyrocyma Diakonoff, 1953
Choanograptis concinna Diakonoff, 1952
Choanograptis concurrens Diakonoff, 1952
Choanograptis diagrapha Diakonoff, 1953
Choanograptis diaphora Diakonoff, 1953
Choanograptis didyma Meyrick, 1938
Choanograptis dihamma (Diakonoff, 1941)
Choanograptis fasciata Diakonoff, 1952
Choanograptis hamuligera Diakonoff, 1953
Choanograptis paragrapha Diakonoff, 1953
Choanograptis parorthota (Meyrick, 1928)
Choanograptis rhabdomaga (Meyrick, 1938)
Choanograptis tetraulax Diakonoff, 1953

See also
 List of Tortricidae genera

References

 , 1938, Trans. R. Soc. Lond. 87: 504.
 , 2005, World Catalogue of Insects 5.

External links
 tortricidae.com

Archipini
Tortricidae genera
Taxa named by Edward Meyrick